Zorzi is an Italian surname. Notable people with the surname include:

13–17th century
 Bertolome Zorzi (fl. 1266–1273), Venetian nobleman, merchant, and troubadour
 Marino Zorzi (1231–1312), 50th doge of the Republic of Venice
 Chiara Zorzi or Giorgio, also Clara or Claire (died 1454), was duchess consort of Athens by marriage to Nerio II Acciaioli
 Nicholas I Zorzi (or Giorgi) (died 1345), Marquess of Bodonitsa
 Jacob Zorzi (also Giacomo Giorgi), the Marquess of Bodonitsa from 1388 to 1410
 Nicholas II Zorzi, Margrave of Bodonitsa,  from 1410 to 1414
 Marino Zorzi (bishop of Brescia) (died 1631), Roman Catholic Bishop of Brescia (1596–1631) and Apostolic Nuncio to Florence 
 Marino Giovanni Zorzi (died 1678), Roman Catholic Bishop of Brescia
 Zorzi Ventura, Italian mannerist painter of the Venetian school, active mainly in Venice, Istria and Dalmatia

20–21st century
 Alvise Zorzi (1922–2016), Italian journalist and writer from Venice
 Andrea Zorzi (born 1965), former Italian volleyball player who won two World Championships
 Angelo Zorzi (1890–1974), Italian gymnast 
 Bruno Zorzi (born 1937),  former Australian rules footballer 
 Cristian Zorzi (born 1972), Italian cross country skier
 Delfo Zorzi, presently known as Roi Hagen, Italian-born Japanese citizen
 Giulio Zorzi (born 1989), South African swimmer 
 Guglielmo Zorzi (1879–1967), Italian screenwriter and film director
 Juan Carlos Zorzi (1935–1999), Argentine musician, composer, and orchestra director
 Lucia Zorzi (born 1961),Italian television writer, producer and consultant
 Mario Zorzi (1910–1944), Italian sports shooter
 Renzo Zorzi (1946–2015), Italian racing driver
 Sergio Zorzi (born 1964), former Italian rugby union player and currently, coach
 Susanna Zorzi (born 1992), Italian racing cyclist
 Veronica Zorzi (born 1980), Italian professional golfer
 William F. Zorzi, journalist and screenwriter

See also
 George (disambiguation)
 Giorgi (surname)
 Giorgi (disambiguation)

Italian-language surnames